The 2020–21 Thai Women's League 1 will be the sixth season of the Thai Women's League, the top Thai professional league for women's association football clubs, since its establishment in 2009. A total of 8 teams will compete in the league. The season will run from 31 October 2020 to 27 March 2021

Teams
Divided into teams placed around the league (Member organizations that are Semi-Final in 2019 Thai Women's League) 4 teams.
 Chonburi Sports School
 BG Bundit Asia
 Bangkok
 Air Force
And teams from the 2020–21 Thai Women's League play-offs round. 4 teams.
Lampang Sports School
BRU Burirat Academy 
MH Nakhonsi 
Chonburi FA

Rules
The 2020–21 Thai Women's League 1 will divide the competition into 2 legs, in the first leg will compete in a meeting, compete at High Performance Training Center (Thailand), where the 1st leg is placed 1–4.Second leg will compete in a meet again Home-Away, within 1–4 places with each other to find the winning team, while 5–8 places at the end of the first leg will compete as a home-away match. And meet each other within the 5th–8th place as well. For the 6th – 7th place will compete in the playoff round with the 2nd – 3rd place from the 2020–21 Thai Women's League 2.

First leg

League table
<onlyinclude>

Second leg

League table
<onlyinclude>

Macthday 1

Macthday 2

Macthday 3

Macthday 4

Macthday 5

Macthday 6

Macthday 7

References

2020
Thailand
2020 in Thai football leagues